Charles Magnette (3 February 1863 – 18 October 1937), was a Belgian lawyer and a liberal politician.

He was President of the Belgian Senate from 1928 until 1932 and Minister of State. He was Grand Master of the Grand Orient of Belgium two times (from 1914 to 1921 and from 1925 to 1927). Magnette was the founder of the International Masonic Association in 1921.

In 1914 and 1916 he appealed to the German Grand Lodges, complaining about the atrocities which were committed by the Germans, who occupied most part of Belgium during World War I, and the deportation of workers. As a result, he served a prison sentence. A street in Liège is named after him.

His brother was the historian Félix Magnette.

Sources
Charles Magnette

External links

|-

|-

1863 births
1937 deaths
People from Virton
Belgian Ministers of State
Presidents of the Senate (Belgium)
Walloon movement activists